Stephen Vincent Benét (July 22, 1898 – March 13, 1943) was an American poet, short story writer, and novelist. He is best known for his book-length narrative poem of the American Civil War, John Brown's Body (1928), for which he received the Pulitzer Prize for Poetry, and for the short stories "The Devil and Daniel Webster" (1936) and "By the Waters of Babylon" (1937). In 2009, Library of America selected his story "The King of the Cats" (1929) for inclusion in its two-century retrospective of American Fantastic Tales, edited by Peter Straub.

Life and career

Early life
Benét was born on July 22, 1898, in Fountain Hill, Pennsylvania, in the Lehigh Valley region of eastern Pennsylvania to James Walker Benét, a colonel in the United States Army. His grandfather and namesake led the Army Ordnance Corps from 1874 to 1891 as a brigadier general and served in the Civil War. His paternal uncle Laurence Vincent Benét was an ensign in the United States Navy during the Spanish–American War and later manufactured the French Hotchkiss machine gun.

Around the age of ten, Benét was sent to the Hitchcock Military Academy. He graduated from Summerville Academy in Augusta, Georgia, and from Yale University, where he was "the power behind the Yale Lit", according to Thornton Wilder, a fellow member of the Elizabethan Club. He also edited and contributed light verse to the campus humor magazine The Yale Record. His first book was published when he was aged 17 and he was awarded an M.A. in English upon submission of his third volume of poetry in lieu of a thesis. He was also a part-time contributor to Time magazine in its early years.

In 1920-21, Benét went to France on a Yale traveling fellowship, where he met Rosemary Carr; the couple married in Chicago in November 1921. Carr was also a writer and poet, and they collaborated on some works.  In 1926, he received a Guggenheim Fellowship award and while living in Paris, wrote John Brown's Body.

Man of letters

Benét helped solidify the place of the Yale Series of Younger Poets Competition and Yale University Press during his decade-long judgeship of the competition. He published the first volumes of James Agee, Muriel Rukeyser, Jeremy Ingalls, and Margaret Walker. He was elected a Member of the American Academy of Arts and Letters in 1929, and Fellow of the American Academy of Arts and Sciences in 1931.

Benét won the O. Henry Award on three occasions, for his short stories An End to Dreams in 1932, The Devil and Daniel Webster in 1937, and Freedom's a Hard-Bought Thing in 1940.

His fantasy short story "The Devil and Daniel Webster" inspired several unauthorized dramatizations by other writers after its initial publication which prompted Benét to adapt his own work for the stage. Benét approached composer Douglas Moore to create an opera of the work with Benét serving as librettist in 1937. The Devil and Daniel Webster: An Opera in One Act (New York: Farrar & Rinehart, 1939) premiered on Broadway in 1939. That work was created from 1937 through 1939, and its libretto served as the basis for a 1938 play adaptation of the work by Benét (The Devil and Daniel Webster: A Play in One Act, New York: Dramatists Play Service, 1938).  The play in turn was used as the source for a screenplay adaptation co-penned by Benét which was originally released as All That Money Can Buy (1941).

Benét also wrote the sequel "Daniel Webster and the Sea Serpent", in which Daniel Webster encounters Leviathan.

Death and legacy

Benét died of a heart attack in New York City on March 13, 1943, at age 44. He was buried in Evergreen Cemetery in Stonington, Connecticut, where he had owned the historic Amos Palmer House. On April 17, 1943, NBC broadcast a special tribute to his life and works which included a performance by Helen Hayes. He was awarded a posthumous Pulitzer Prize in 1944 for Western Star, an unfinished narrative poem on the settling of the United States.

Benét adapted the Roman myth of the rape of the Sabine Women into the story "The Sobbin' Women". That story was adapted as the musical film Seven Brides for Seven Brothers (1954), then as a stage musical (1978) and then TV series (1982). His play John Brown's Body was staged on Broadway in 1953 in a three-person dramatic reading featuring Tyrone Power, Judith Anderson, and Raymond Massey, directed by Charles Laughton. The book was included in Life magazine's list of the 100 outstanding books of 1924–44.

Dee Brown's Bury My Heart at Wounded Knee takes its title from the final phrase of Benét's poem "American Names". The full quotation appears at the beginning of Brown's book:
I shall not be there
I shall rise and pass
Bury my heart at Wounded Knee.

Selected works
 Five Men and Pompey, a series of dramatic portraits, Poetry, 1915
 The Drug-Shop, or, Endymion in Edmonstoun (Yale University Prize Poem), 1917
 Young Adventure: A book of Poems, 1918
 Heavens and Earth, 1920
 The Beginnings of Wisdom: A Novel, 1921
 Young People's Pride: A Novel, 1922
 Jean Huguenot: A Novel, 1923
 The Ballad of William Sycamore: A Poem, 1923
 King David: A two-hundred-line ballad in six parts, 1923
 Nerves, 1924 (A play, with John C. Farrar)
 That Awful Mrs. Eaton, 1924 (A play, with John C. Farrar)
 Tiger Joy:  A Book of Poems, 1925
 The Mountain Whippoorwill: How Hill-Billy Jim Won the Great Fiddler's Prize: A Poem., 1925
 The Bat, 1926 (ghostwritten novelization of the play by Mary Roberts Rinehart and Avery Hopwood)
 Spanish Bayonet, 1926
 John Brown's Body, 1928
 The Barefoot Saint: A Short Story, 1929
 The Litter of Rose Leaves: A Short Story, 1930
 Abraham Lincoln, 1930 (screenplay with Gerrit Lloyd)
 Ballads and Poems, 1915–1930, 1931
 A Book of Americans, 1933 (with Rosemary Carr Benét, his wife)
 James Shore's Daughter: A Novel, 1934
 The Burning City, 1936 (includes 'Litany for Dictatorships')
 The Magic of Poetry and the Poet's Art, 1936
 The Devil and Daniel Webster, 1936
 By the Waters of Babylon, 1937
 The Headless Horseman: one-act play, 1937
 Thirteen O'Clock, 1937
 We Aren't Superstitious, 1937 (Essay on the Salem Witch Trials)
 Johnny Pye and the Fool Killer: A Short Story, 1938
 Tales Before Midnight: Collection of Short Stories, 1939
 The Ballad of the Duke's Mercy, 1939
 The Devil and Daniel Webster, 1939 (opera libretto with Douglas Moore)
 A Song of Three Soldiers, 1940
 Elementals, 1940–41 (broadcast)
 Freedom's Hard-Bought Thing, 1941 (broadcast)
 Listen to the People, 1941
 A Summons to the Free, 1941
 William Riley and the Fates, 1941
 Cheers for Miss Bishop, 1941 (screenplay with Adelaide Heilbron, Sheridan Gibney)
 The Devil and Daniel Webster, 1941 (screenplay with Dan Totheroh)
 Selected Works, 1942 (2 vols.)
 Short Stories, 1942
 Nightmare at Noon: Short Poem, 1942 (in The Treasury Star Parade, ed. by William A. Bacher)
 A Child is Born, 1942 (broadcast)
 They Burned the Books, 1942
 They Burned the Books, 1942 (broadcast)

These works were published posthumously:
 Western Star, 1943 (unfinished)
 Twenty Five Short Stories, 1943
 America, 1944
 O'Halloran's Luck and Other Short Stories, 1944
 We Stand United, 1945 (radio scripts)
 The Bishop's Beggar, 1946
 The Last Circle, 1946
 Selected Stories, 1947
 From the Earth to the Moon, 1958

References

Sources

External links

 
 
 Works by Stephen Vincent Benét at Project Gutenberg Australia
 "We Aren't Superstitious", an essay by Stephen Vincent Benét 
 
 
 Works by Stephen Vincent Benét (public domain in Canada)
 
 
 Stephen Vincent Benét and Rosemary Benét Papers at Yale Collection of American Literature, Beinecke Rare Book and Manuscript Library

1898 births
1943 deaths
20th-century American journalists
20th-century American non-fiction writers
20th-century American short story writers
American fantasy writers
American male journalists
American male novelists
American male short story writers
American opera librettists
20th-century American male writers
20th-century American novelists
20th-century American poets
American people of Catalan descent
Fellows of the American Academy of Arts and Sciences
Poets from Pennsylvania
O. Henry Award winners
Pulitzer Prize for Poetry winners
The Yale Record alumni
Members of the American Academy of Arts and Letters